Abalakovo is the name of several inhabited localities in Russia.

Krasnoyarsk Krai
As of 2010, two rural localities in Krasnoyarsk Krai bear this name:
Abalakovo, Sayansky District, Krasnoyarsk Krai
Abalakovo, Yeniseysky District, Krasnoyarsk Krai

Irkutsk Oblast
As of 2010, one rural locality in Irkutsk Oblast bears this name:
Abalakovo, Irkutsk Oblast